Roger Theisen (born 11 February 1932) is a Luxembourgian épée, foil and sabre fencer. He competed at the 1956 and 1960 Summer Olympics.

References

External links
 

1932 births
Possibly living people
Luxembourgian male foil fencers
Luxembourgian male épée fencers
Olympic fencers of Luxembourg
Fencers at the 1956 Summer Olympics
Fencers at the 1960 Summer Olympics
Sportspeople from Luxembourg City
Luxembourgian male sabre fencers